West Bromwich Albion Football Club Women is an English women's football club affiliated with West Bromwich Albion F.C. The first team currently plays in the . In 2010–11, the then named Sporting Club Albion won the Midland Combination Women's Football League promoting them to the FA Women's Premier League.

The club is also closely affiliated with West Bromwich Albion Girls Regional Talent Centre, with the objective of bringing through Youth Players into the first team, as well as the Disability Sports Club and Basketball clubs.

History

Early years (1989–2008) 
The club was founded as West Bromwich Albion Women's F.C. in 1989 playing local and recreational football. In 1995 they joined the Midland Combination Women's Football League, but was not part of West Bromwich Albion F.C. In the 2004–05 season they were incorporated in the WBA Community Programme and committed to developing youth players. They continued in this way for four more seasons.

The Albion Foundation (2009–2011) 
In 2009 the club was part of The Albion Foundation and was incorporated into Sporting Club Albion, alongside the Basketball and Disabled Sports teams. Their second season in this format saw them win the Midlands Combination Women's Football League title and gain promotion the FA Women's Premier League in the process. In the summer of 2011 the announcement of the Girls Centre of Excellence brought new promise of improvement in the development of young players.

Recent years (2012–present) 
Over the next seasons they have stabilised themselves in the Premier League Northern Division and are looking to become one of the strongest teams over the next few years.

In the 2015/16 season under the leadership of manager Graham Abercrombie, the club achieved a league and cup double winning both the FA Women's Premier League Northern Division and the Birmingham Ladies County Cup. They narrowly missed out on promotion to the FA Women's Super League Division 2, losing 4–2 in a playoff with FA Women's Premier League Southern Division champions Brighton & Hove Albion W.F.C. They also made it to the quarter finals of the FA Women's Cup, losing 2–0 to Super League side Manchester City W.F.C.

For the 2016–17 season, the club reverted to the West Bromwich Albion name where they had another successful campaign winning the Birmingham Ladies County Cup for a second year running under new manager Craig Nicholls.

In the 2017–2018 season, the club appointed Louis Sowe as new manager, but despite reaching the Birmingham Ladies County Cup Semi-Final, they suffered relegation to the newly named FA Women's National League Midlands Division One.

Colours and badge 
Their kits are identical to those of West Bromwich Albion F.C.

Stadium 
West Bromwich Albion Women play their home games at Keys Park, home of Hednesford Town.

Players

Current squad

Coaching staff

Honours 
Midland Combination Women's Football League
 Champions: 2010-11
FA Women's Premier League Northern Division
 Champions 2015-16 (As Sporting Club Albion Ladies)
Birmingham Women's County Cup
 Winners 2016-17
 Winners 2015-16 (As Sporting Club Albion Ladies)
 Runners up 2014-15

References

External links 
 West Bromwich Albion FC Women content at WordPress

Women's football clubs in England
West Bromwich Albion F.C.
1989 establishments in England
Association football clubs established in 1989
Football clubs in the West Midlands (county)
FA Women's National League teams